LIM domain-binding protein 2 is a protein that in humans is encoded by the LDB2 gene.

References

Further reading